is a passenger railway station located in the city of Kuwana,  Mie Prefecture, Japan, operated by the private railway operator Yōrō Railway.

Lines

Station layout
The station consists of one ground-level side platform and one ground-level island platform connected by a level crossing, with the station building located on one side of the side platform. However, one half of the island platform is not in use.

Platforms

Adjacent stations 

|-
!colspan=5|Yōrō Railway

History
Tado Station opened on April 27, 1919 as a station on the Yōrō Railway. The Yōrō Railway became the Ise Electric Railway’s Yōrō Line on October 1, 1929, but re-emerged as the Yōrō Railway on April 20, 1936. It merged with the Sangu Electric Railway on August 1, 1940, and through a series of mergers became part of the Kansai Express Railway on June 1, 1944. The line was split off into the new Yōrō Railway on October 1, 2007.

Passenger statistics
In fiscal 2019, the station was used by an average of 731 passengers daily (boarding passengers only).

Surrounding area
 Japan National Route 258

See also
 List of Railway Stations in Japan

References

External links

 

Railway stations in Mie Prefecture
Railway stations in Japan opened in 1919
Stations of Yōrō Railway
Kuwana, Mie